Vahagn Felixi Asatryan (14 January 1977 – 12 October 2020) was an Armenian military leader, Colonel of the Armed Forces of Armenia, National Hero of Armenia.

Biography

Military service

Second Nagorno-Karabakh War 
Vahagn Asatryan took part in the armed conflict in Nagorno-Karabakh, where he was posthumously awarded the title of National Hero of Armenia for his distinction in military activity.

Funeral 
On 15 October 2020, Asatryan was buried in the Yerablur Military Pantheon.

Awards and honors 
On October 15, 2020, the Prime Minister of Armenia Nikol Pashinyan submitted a petition to the President of the Republic to posthumously confer the title of National Hero to Colonel Vahagn Asatryan. On the same day, by the decree of the President of Armenia Armen Sarkissian, Vahagn Asatryan was posthumously awarded the Order of the Fatherland for outstanding services in the defense and security of the Motherland, dedication during hostilities and was awarded the title of National Hero of Armenia.

Personal life 
He was married and raised two sons.

References 

1977 births
2020 deaths
National Hero of Armenia
Armenian colonels
Armenian military personnel of the 2020 Nagorno-Karabakh war